In the domain of prospective memory, task appropriate processing refers to the overlap between processing operations required to perform an ongoing task and the processing operations required to perform the prospective memory task. Task appropriate processing is characterized by a concurrent overlap that occurs within the test phase of a prospective memory test. Prospective memory tasks also provide the opportunity for sequential overlap between the learning and test phase. This can be considered as similar to transfer-appropriate processing in retrospective memory.

Memory